Gijsbertus Houtzagers (30 September 1888, Barneveld - 11 May 1957, Arnhem) was a Dutch botanist employed as Professor of Sylviculture (Temperate Zone) for the Netherlands Organisation for Applied Scientific Research at the De Dorschkamp Research Institute and  best known for his work on the taxonomy of Poplar, the subject of his PhD.

Works 
Houtzagers, G. (1939?). Nomina ambigua proposals about the botanical names of some Poplars. 10pp. Lanjouw, J. Ed. Proposals of Dutch Botanists. 1950 -26. Arnhem.

References 

1888 births
1957 deaths
20th-century Dutch botanists
Botanists with author abbreviations
People from Barneveld